Franklin House, and variations such as Franklin Hall or Franklin Apartments, may refer to:

United States
(by state then city)
 Franklin House (San Diego, California), an historic hotel
 Franklin House (Athens, Georgia), an NRHP-listed building
 Griffith-Franklin House, an NRHP-listed house in Calhoun, Kentucky
 Edwards–Franklin House, an NRHP-listed house in Dobson, North Carolina
 Edwards-Franklin House, a historic house museum in Low Gap, North Carolina
 Franklin-Penland House, an NRHP-listed house in Linville Falls, North Carolina
 Galt-Franklin Home, Ardmore, Oklahoma, NRHP-listed in Carter County
 Franklin Hall (Goodwell, Oklahoma), NRHP-listed
 M. E. Franklin House, Tahlequah, Oklahoma, NRHP-listed in Cherokee County
 Metcalf-Franklin Farm, an NRHP-listed farm and house in Cumberland, Rhode Island
Oakley (Gallatin, Tennessee), known also as the Dr. John W. Franklin House, NRHP-listed
Lawson D. Franklin House, an NRHP-listed house in White Pine, Tennessee
Thomas H. Franklin House, San Antonio, Texas, listed on the NRHP in Bexar County

Other places
 Benjamin Franklin House, a Grade I listed historic house museum in City of Westminster, U.K.
 Franklin House (Launceston), a museum in Franklin Village, Tasmania, Australia

See also
 Franklin Apartments, Des Moines, Iowa
 Franklin Hotel (disambiguation)
 Franklin Printing House, a historic building in Iowa City, Iowa
 Franklin School (disambiguation)